Vamp (initiated in 1990) is a folk-rock band from Haugesund, Norway with founding members Øyvind Staveland, Calle Øyvind Apeland, Paul Hansen, Bjørn Berge, Odin Staveland and Tore Jamne. The band's musical profile is a mix of Norwegian traditional folk music combined with rock.

Biography 
Vamp have released 11 studio albums, collected ten gold records, three platinum records, two triple platinum and been awarded Spellemannprisen five times. After the success of I full symfoni, which is a live album from concerts with Kringkastingsorkesteret, they were named the spellemann of the year at the Spellemannprisen award in 2006.

They have a large and loyal fan base in power of both their music and the Norwegian lyrics. Most of the lyrics are written by Norwegian poets and writers. Most notable of their lyrical collaborators are Kolbein Falkeid, whom they have worked with throughout his career. Falkeid has written the bulk of the lyrics on the first three albums, and his texts have been used in all the other albums as well. Another important contributor to text page is Arnt Birkedal who has contributed lyrics to most of the albums, as well as Ingvar Hovland, who has been the main contributor on the last two albums. Most of the music is written by Øyvind Staveland and at the beginning of their career Jan Toft contributed lyrics.

In 2014 Bjørn Berge replaced Torbjørn Økland as guitarist in the band.

Members 

Permanent members
 Øyvind Staveland (born 20 May 1960) – violin, viola, accordion, flute, vocals (1990 – current)
Joining members
 Odin Staveland – drums, vocals, keys – (2008 – current)
 Jan Toft – vocals, guitar (1991–1999, 2014- current)
 Stian Tønnesen – guitar (2019 – current)
 Kjetil Dalland – bass (2014 - current)
 Lars Eirik Støle - keys  (2015 - current)

Former members
 Bjørn Berge – guitar, vocals (2014 – 2019)
 Carl Øyvind Apeland (Calle Øyvind Apeland) (born 18 April 1964) – bass, keyboards, guitar, backing vocals (1990 – 2014)
 Torbjørn Økland – guitar, mandolin, bouzouki, trumpet, chorus (1990 – 2014)
 Paul Hansen – vocals, guitar, harmonica (2008 – 2014)
 Tore Jamne – drums, percussion (1998–2005, 2010 – 2014)
 Erling Sande – drums, percussion (1990–1995)
 Cliffie Grinde – drums, percussion (1995–1998)
 Vidar Johnsen – vocals, guitar, keyboards, percussion (2002–2006)
 Birger Mistereggen – drums, percussion, harmonica (2008–2009)

Discography

Albums

Live albums

Collaborations

Compilation albums

Singles
Charting

References

External links 

Norwegian folk musical groups
Musical groups established in 1990
Spellemannprisen winners
Musical groups from Haugesund